A local election was held in the State of Mexico, Mexico on Sunday, March 12, 2006. About 3.5 million people (40% of the total registered electorate) went to the polls to elect, on the local level:

125 municipal presidents (mayors) to serve for a three-year term.
75 local deputies (45 by the first-past-the-post system and 30 by proportional representation) to serve for a three-year term in the Congress of the State of México.

In addition to the eight nationally recognized political parties, the State of Mexico has, as of 2006, one locally recognized political party, the Partido Unidos por México (PUM), therefore nine political parties will participate in the Mexico state election.

Election results
Official results can be found at the 2006 elections website.

Municipalities

Local Congress

External links
Electoral Institute of the State of Mexico website

State of Mexico
Election
State of Mexico elections